Euneomys is a genus of rodent in the family Cricetidae.
It contains the following species:
 Patagonian chinchilla mouse (Euneomys chinchilloides)
 Burrowing chinchilla mouse (Euneomys fossor)
 Biting chinchilla mouse (Euneomys mordax)
 Peterson's chinchilla mouse (Euneomys petersoni)

References

 
Rodent genera
Taxonomy articles created by Polbot